Sar Howz may refer to:
 Sar Howz-e Bala
 Sar Howz-e Pain